"The Trip" is the two-part fourth season premiere of the NBC sitcom Seinfeld. They are the 41st and 42nd episodes of the series overall, and the episodes aired on August 12 and August 19, 1992. Following Kramer's move to Los Angeles in the previous episode, "The Keys", in this episode Jerry and George try to look up Kramer while in Los Angeles for Jerry to appear on a talk show, only to find Kramer is suspected of being a serial killer referred to as the "Smog Strangler".

Plot

Part 1
Jerry is offered two free tickets from New York City to Hollywood to appear on The Tonight Show with Jay Leno. He offers one to George and they decide that while they are in Los Angeles they will track down Kramer, who headed to Los Angeles in the previous episode, "The Keys", to become an actor. Kramer has attended several auditions but without any luck.

Police are searching for "The Smog Strangler," a serial killer roaming the streets of Los Angeles. Chelsea, a woman Kramer met during auditions, turns up dead in another part of the city with the script Kramer gave to her found on her body.

George thinks he has insightful conversations with the talk show guests Corbin Bernsen and George Wendt, but they both call him "some nut" during their subsequent interviews. Jerry can't remember the words for a joke and blames the hotel maid, Lupe, who threw his notes away while cleaning the room. As Jerry and George leave The Tonight Show, they see Kramer's picture on the news. He is the prime suspect for the "Smog Strangler".

Part 2
Jerry and George try to help clear Kramer of the accusation. They use a payphone to call the police and they say they have important information regarding the stranglings. Two policemen in a cruiser come to pick them up and take them back to the station. On their way, the officers see a man trying to break into a car. They arrest him and put him in the back with Jerry and George; Jerry and the man get into an argument about tipping, with the latter insisting that Jerry's tipping habits are too cheap. They have to stop again when they get a police call regarding Kramer the "Smog Strangler" and happen to be close to the scene. Jerry and George want to make sure Kramer is not imprisoned, so they flee from the car, and, in their hurry, leave the door open. The man who had been in the back seat with them escapes.

Kramer is taken to the police station and is questioned by the lieutenant, causing Kramer to have a nervous breakdown and begin hysterically sobbing. While he is being interrogated, the lieutenant receives a phone call revealing that the Smog Strangler has killed another victim while Kramer was in custody, and so he is released. After Kramer is exonerated, Jerry and George decide to return to New York, but Kramer opts to remain in Los Angeles. However, by the end of the episode, Kramer has returned to New York and is once again living across the hall from Jerry. He offers no explanation of his return. He and Jerry return each other's spare keys as a sign that they have reconciled after their argument in "The Keys".

It is revealed that the Smog Strangler is suspected to be the man that George and Jerry accidentally allowed to escape. It is broadcast on the news that his whereabouts are unknown, but that he is a generous tipper.

Production
The scene in which the man breaks into the car was shot near the Bicycle Shack on Ventura Place in Studio City, California, a short distance from CBS Studio Center, the main studio for Seinfeld. When Kramer is confronted by the police at his apartment (about 12 minutes into the episode), Larry David and episode writer Larry Charles can be seen standing in the crowd behind the officers, at the far right of the scene. The cop riding shotgun is the same actor that would later portray Jake Jarmel. The hotel/apartment that Kramer is staying in while in Hollywood is in the same building that was used in Pretty Woman, in which Jason Alexander co-starred.

This was the only two-part episode of Seinfeld in which both parts had the same name but were aired on two separate dates instead of a one-hour special. However, "The Wallet"/"The Watch" is a continuation episode pairing which also aired on separate dates with a "To Be Continued" at the end of "The Wallet".

Elaine does not appear in either part of "The Trip", and appears only minimally in "The Pitch" and "The Ticket", because Julia Louis-Dreyfus was on maternity leave.

Kramer's first name is missing from the script found on the dead woman's body, a reference to how—at this point in time—no one knows his full name.

The episodes were broadcast much earlier than the typical September premiere for a new season, as NBC wanted to cash in on ratings from the 1992 Barcelona Olympics (which NBC also covered) and as such these two episodes got some of the highest Nielsen ratings thus far.

References

External links
 - Part One
 - Part Two

Seinfeld (season 4) episodes
1992 American television episodes
Seinfeld episodes in multiple parts